Ribka Sugiarto (born 22 January 2000) is an Indonesian badminton player specializing in doubles. Born in Tangerang, she was selected to join the Djarum club in 2013. Sugiarto was the gold medalist at the 2018 Asian Junior Championships partnered with Febriana Dwipuji Kusuma, and won her first senior international title in 2019 Indonesia Masters, a Super 100 tournament with Siti Fadia Silva Ramadhanti.

Career

2022 
In June, Ribka Sugiarto was paired with Febby Valencia Dwijayanti Gani and lost in the quarter-finals of Indonesia Masters. In July, they also lost in the quarter-finals of Malaysia Open.

In October, Ribka Sugiarto was paired with Lanny Tria Mayasari and lost in the second round of 2022 Vietnam Open, but won the Malang Indonesia International, her first senior title. In December, they won their second titles at the Bahrain International Challenge.

2023 
Sugiarto and her partner, Lanny Tria Mayasari, started the BWF tour in the home tournament, Indonesia Masters, but lost in the second round from Indian pair Tanisha Crasto and Ashwini Ponnappa. In the next tournament, they lost in the quarter-finals of the Thailand Masters from Korean pair Baek Ha-na and Lee So-hee.

In February, Sugiarto join the Indonesia national badminton team to compete at the Badminton Asia Mixed Team Championships, but unfortunately the teams lost in the quarter-finals from team Korea.

Achievements

BWF World Junior Championships 
Girls' doubles

Asian Junior Championships 
Girls' doubles

BWF World Tour (1 title) 
The BWF World Tour, which was announced on 19 March 2017 and implemented in 2018, is a series of elite badminton tournaments sanctioned by the Badminton World Federation (BWF). The BWF World Tour is divided into levels of World Tour Finals, Super 1000, Super 750, Super 500, Super 300 (part of the HSBC World Tour), and the BWF Tour Super 100.

Women's doubles

BWF International Challenge/Series (2 title, 2 runners-up) 
Women's doubles

  BWF International Challenge tournament
  BWF International Series tournament

BWF Junior International (3 titles, 2 runners-up) 
Girls' doubles

Mixed doubles

  BWF Junior International Grand Prix tournament
  BWF Junior International Challenge tournament
  BWF Junior International Series tournament
  BWF Junior Future Series tournament

Performance timeline

National team 
 Junior level

 Senior level

Individual competitions

Junior level 
Girls' doubles

Mixed doubles

Senior level

Women's doubles

Mixed doubles

References

External links 
 

Living people
2000 births
People from Tangerang
Sportspeople from Banten
Indonesian female badminton players
Competitors at the 2019 Southeast Asian Games
Competitors at the 2021 Southeast Asian Games
Southeast Asian Games silver medalists for Indonesia
Southeast Asian Games medalists in badminton
21st-century Indonesian women